Popolžani is a village in the municipality of Kičevo, North Macedonia. It used to be part of the former Drugovo Municipality.

Demographics
As of the 2021 census, Popolžani had 115 residents with the following ethnic composition:
Macedonians 114
Others 1

According to the 2002 census, the village had a total of 109 inhabitants. Ethnic groups in the village include:
Macedonians 108
Serbs 1

References

Villages in Kičevo Municipality